The 1952 Coorg Legislative Assembly election was held to constitute the Coorg Legislative Assembly, electing members of legislature for 18 constituencies of the erstwhile Indian State of Coorg. It took place on 27 March 1952 and a total of 87,947 people voted 24 out of 60 candidates to power. This was the only election to the assembly before the State was merged into Mysore (later renamed as Karnataka) as per the States Reorganisation Act in 1956.

Constituencies
A total of 24 seats were up for election from 18 constituencies; six two-member constituencies and twelve single-member constituencies. No seats were reserved for Scheduled Castes or Scheduled Tribes.

Contestants
Sixty candidates contested the election. The Indian National Congress presented candidates in all 24 constituencies. There were also 34 independent candidates. The Takkadi Party, which campaigned against merger into Mysore State, contested as independents. The Takkadi Party was led by Pandyanda Belliappa, a veteran Gandhian. A third force in the election was the Communist Party of India, that only presented two candidates (C.B. Monniah in Hudikeri and B.N. Kuttappa in Siddapur). No female candidates were in the fray.

Results
The Indian National Congress (INC) emerged victorious, winning 15 out of the 24 seats. The INC leader C. M. Poonacha won his seat from the Berriathnad constituency, with 1,969 votes (71.37 per cent of the votes polled in the constituency). Nine independent candidates won the remaining seats. Belliappa won his seat Ammathi Nad with 1,667 votes (57.25 per cent of votes polled). INC candidates got 55.54 per cent of the votes polled statewide, independents 42.88 per cent and the two communist candidates 1.58 per cent. The candidate with the highest percentage of votes polled in his favour was G. Lingarajayya, the INC candidate in Fraserpet, who polled 2,375 votes (71.64 per cent).

!colspan=8|
|- style="background-color:#E9E9E9; text-align:center;"
! class="unsortable" |
! Political party !! Flag !! Candidates !! Won !! % of  Seats !! Votes !! Vote %
|- style="background: #90EE90;"
| 
| style="text-align:left;" |Indian National Congress
| 
| 24 || 15 || 62.50 || 48,845 || 55.54
|-
| 
|
| 34 || 9 || 37.50 || 37,716 || 42.88
|-
| 
| style="text-align:left;" |Communist Party of India
| 
| 2 || 0 ||  || 1,386 || 1.58
|- class="unsortable" style="background-color:#E9E9E9"
!colspan=3|Total
! 
! 24
!colspan=3|Voters: 138,440 Turnout 87,947 (63.53%)
|}

Members of the Coorg Legislative Assembly, 1952

Keys: 

After the election, Poonacha formed a two-member cabinet, consisting of himself as Chief Minister and Kuttur Mallapa (elected to the assembly from the Sanivarsanthe constituency) as Home Minister.

See also

 1951–52 elections in India
 1952 Mysore Legislative Assembly election
 1957 Mysore Legislative Assembly election

References

Elections in Coorg State
State Assembly elections in Karnataka
Coorg
March 1952 events in Asia